Winston Thomas Siegfried (December 2, 1916 – January 26, 2006) was an American football coach. He was the 24th head football coach at The Apprentice School in Newport News, Virginia and he held that position for two seasons, from 1969 until 1970.  His coaching record at Apprentice was 5–10.

References

1916 births
2006 deaths
The Apprentice Builders football coaches
Sportspeople from Richmond, Virginia